Objectif et action Mutualistes, or simply Mutualistes, is a French language bimonthly family magazine published in France.

History and profile
Objectif et action Mutualistes was established in 1979. The magazine is published on a bimonthly basis. Its headquarters is in Paris.

The circulation of the magazine was 363,010 copies in 2013 and 336,925 copies in 2014.

References

External links
Official website

1979 establishments in France
Bi-monthly magazines published in France
French-language magazines
Lifestyle magazines
Magazines established in 1979
Magazines published in Paris